Nicole Abar is a French former footballer who played as a forward for Reims of the Division 1 Féminine.

References

1959 births
Living people
French people of Italian descent
French women's footballers
Division 1 Féminine players
Stade de Reims Féminines players
French sportspeople of Algerian descent
Women's association football midfielders
France women's international footballers
People from Toulouse